Acharya N. G. Ranga Agricultural University (ANGRAU) is a public agricultural university with its headquarters at the village Lam, Guntur district, Andhra Pradesh, India.

History 

The original Andhra Pradesh Agricultural University was established on 12 June 1964 through the APAU Act 1963 with O. Pulla Reddy as the first vice-chancellor. It was formally inaugurated on 20 March 1965, by Lal Bahadur Shastri, the then Prime Minister of India in Hyderabad. On 23 June 1966, another milestone was the inauguration of the building program of the university by Indira Gandhi, the then Prime Minister of India. Later, it was renamed as Acharya N. G. Ranga Agricultural University on 7 November 1996. Those institutions that were located in the residuary state of Andhra Pradesh were then grouped under a new university with the same name as Acharya N G Ranga Agricultural University was established in Guntur.

Based on the recommendation of the committee and approval by the Competent Authority of ICAR (Indian Council of Agricultural Research), the ranking Status of Acharya N G Ranga Agricultural University for the year 2017-18 is 27 while the Acharya Jai Shankar Agricultural University is ranked at 12.

According to the Andhra Pradesh Agricultural University Act, 1963, Colleges of Agriculture and Veterinary Science, Hyderabad (affiliated to Osmania University), Agricultural College, Bapatla (affiliated with Andhra University), Sri Venkateswara Agricultural College and Andhra Veterinary College, Tirupati (affiliated to Sri Venkateswara University) were transferred to the new university in June 1964. About 41 agricultural research stations and four research stations were transferred to the university in July 1966 and May 1967, respectively.

Colleges 
The university has 11 colleges:

 Faculty of Agriculture
 Agricultural College, Bapatla, Guntur district, established 1945 	
 S.V. Agricultural College, Tirupati, Chittoor district, established 1961 	
 Agricultural College, Naira, Srikakulam district, established 1989
 Agricultural College, Mahanandi, Kurnool district, established 1991
 College of Agriculture, Rajahmundry, East Godavari district, established 2008
 Faculty of Community Science 
 College of Community Science, Lam, Guntur district, established 2013
 Faculty of Agricultural Engineering & Technology
 Dr. NTR College of Agricultural Engineering, Bapatla, Guntur district, established 1983 	
 College of Agricultural Engineering, Madakasira, Anantapur district, established 2008
 Dr. NTR College of Food Science & Technology, Bapatla, Guntur district, established 2003
 College of Food Science & Technology, Pulivendula, Kadapa district, established 2008
 Advanced Post Graduate Centre
 Advance Post Graduate Centre, Lam, Guntur district, established 2013,
 Faculty of Diploma in Agricultural Engineering
Polytechnic of Agricultural Engineering, Kalikiri, Chittoor district 2013
Polytechnic of Agricultural Engineering, Anakapalle, Vishakapatnam district 2013

Vice Chancellors 

 A. Padma Raju (2016)
 T. Vijay Kumar (i/c)
 B. Rajsekhar (i/c)
 A. Akshay Kumar (i/c)
 V. Damodara Naidu (2017–2020) 
 Y. Madhusudhan Reddy (i/c)
 A. Vishnu Vardhana Reddy (2020 – Till to date)

Publications 
The university publishes The Journal of Research ANGRAU, a quarterly journal.

Notable alumni
Kanneboyina Nagaraju, Professor, Binghamton University, USA (graduate from College of Veterinary Sciences, Tirupati, 1986)
Marri Shashidhar Reddy, former MLA (Telangana)
Jetti A. Oliver, Chancellor of Sam Higginbottom University of Agriculture, Technology and Sciences

References

External links 

 

Universities in Guntur
Educational institutions established in 1964
1964 establishments in Andhra Pradesh
State universities in Andhra Pradesh
Agricultural universities and colleges in Andhra Pradesh